Lady Augusta Elizabeth Frederica Stanley (3 April 1822 – 1 March 1876), was daughter of Thomas Bruce, 7th Earl of Elgin and Elizabeth Oswald, Countess of Elgin. She was brought up in Paris after her father died. She was lady in waiting to Queen Victoria. She met and later married Arthur P. Stanley, Dean of Westminster at the home of Mary Elizabeth Mohl in Paris.

She unveiled Joseph Edgar Boehm's statue of John Bunyan in Bedford in 1874.

She is buried alongside her husband in Henry VII's chapel in Westminster Abbey. A memorial to Lady Augusta, commissioned by Her Majesty, Queen Victoria, stands at Frogmore.

Bibliography
Some of Stanley's letters are published in Letters of Lady Augusta Stanley: A Young Lady at Court 1849-1863 edited by the Dean of Windsor and Hector Bolitho.

References

External links

1822 births
1876 deaths
British ladies-in-waiting
Daughters of Scottish earls
Augusta